Byrdsong is a surname. Notable people with the surname include:

 Ricky Byrdsong (1956–1999), American basketball coach and insurance executive
 Shawn Byrdsong (born 1979), American football player